In mathematics, a fundamental solution for a linear partial differential operator  is a formulation in the language of distribution theory of the older idea of a Green's function (although unlike Green's functions, fundamental solutions do not address boundary conditions).

In terms of the Dirac delta "function" , a fundamental solution  is a solution of the inhomogeneous equation

Here  is a priori only assumed to be a distribution.

This concept has long been utilized for the Laplacian in two and three dimensions. It was investigated for all dimensions for the Laplacian by Marcel Riesz.

The existence of a fundamental solution for any operator with constant coefficients — the most important case, directly linked to the possibility of using convolution to solve an arbitrary right hand side — was shown by Bernard Malgrange and Leon Ehrenpreis. In the context of functional analysis, fundamental solutions are usually developed via the Fredholm alternative and explored in Fredholm theory.

Example
Consider the following differential equation  with

The fundamental solutions can be obtained by solving , explicitly,

Since for the Heaviside function  we have

there is a solution

Here  is an arbitrary constant introduced by the integration. For convenience, set .

After integrating  and choosing the new integration constant as zero, one has

Motivation

Once the fundamental solution is found, it is straightforward to find a solution of the original equation, through convolution of the fundamental solution and the desired right hand side.

Fundamental solutions also play an important role in the numerical solution of partial differential equations by the boundary element method.

Application to the example
Consider the operator  and the differential equation mentioned in the example,

We can find the solution  of the original equation by convolution (denoted by an asterisk) of the right-hand side  with the fundamental solution : 

An example that more clearly works

where  is the characteristic (indicator) function of the unit interval .

Proof that the convolution is a solution
We want to prove that  is a solution of the previous equation, i.e. we want to prove that . When applying the differential operator, to the convolution, it is known that

provided  has constant coefficients.

If  is the fundamental solution, the right side of the equation reduces to

But since the delta function is an identity element for convolution, this is simply . Summing up,

This does not mean that it is the only solution. Several solutions for different initial conditions can be found.

Fundamental solutions for some partial differential equations
The following can be obtained by means of Fourier transform:

Laplace equation
For the Laplace equation,

the fundamental solutions in two and three dimensions, respectively, are

Screened Poisson equation
For the screened Poisson equation,

the fundamental solutions are

where  is a modified Bessel function of the second kind. 

In higher dimensions the fundamental solution of the screened Poisson equation is given by the Bessel potential.

Biharmonic equation
For the Biharmonic equation,

the biharmonic equation has the fundamental solutions

Signal processing

In signal processing, the analog of the fundamental solution of a differential equation is called the impulse response of a filter.

See also
 Green's function
 Impulse response
 Parametrix

References

 For adjustment to Green's function on the boundary see Shijue Wu notes.

Partial differential equations
Generalized functions
Schwartz distributions
Fredholm theory